The Norwegian Basketball Federation also known as NBBF is the governing body for basketball in Norway. It was formed in 1966, and joined FIBA in 1968. They are headquartered in Oslo.

The Norwegian Basketball Federation operates the Norway men's national team and Norway women's national team. They organize national competitions in Norway, for both the men's and women's senior teams and also the youth national basketball teams.

The top level professional league in Norway is the BLNO.

As of 2020, its president has been Hendrik Parmann.

See also
Norway men's national basketball team
Norway men's national under-18 basketball team
Norway men's national under-16 basketball team
Norway women's national basketball team
Norway women's national under-18 basketball team
Norway women's national under-16 basketball team

References

External links
Official website 
Norway at FIBA site

Basketball in Norway
Basketball
Fed
Sports organisations of Norway
Basketball governing bodies in Europe
Organisations based in Oslo
Sports organizations established in 1966